Osam-bulgogi is a Korean dish made from squid (ojingeo in Korean) and pork belly (samgyeopsal in Korean), marinated in a blend of seasonings. The mixture is cooked over a griddle with an assortment of vegetables and mushrooms.

South Korean meat dishes
Korean seafood dishes
Pork dishes
Squid dishes